Bulbophyllum sect. Cirrhopetaloides is a section of the genus Bulbophyllum.

Description
The pseudobulbs are conical-shaped and obscurely angled with a single spoon-like leaf atop each pseudobulb.

Distribution
Plants from this section are found from India, Sri Lanka, and China to Southeast Asia.

Species
Bulbophyllum section  Cirrhopetaloides comprises the following species:

References

Orchid subgenera